Erzsébet Szilágyi (c. 1410–1483) was a Hungarian noblewoman, wife of John Hunyadi and mother of Matthias Corvinus, King of Hungary.

Elizabeth was the daughter of the Ladislaus Szilágyi and Catherine Bellyéni, members of two influential Hungarian families of the 15th century that were loyal to the King Sigismund of Hungary. She had several siblings, including Mihály Szilágyi, who had an important role after the death of Elizabeth's husband, John Hunyadi. Hunyadi was the regent of the Kingdom of Hungary and supreme commander of the armies, an excellent fighter, that counted with the favor of the Pope for confronting the Ottoman Empire. He was the most powerful nobleman of the Kingdom and counted with huge properties and centenars of lower noblemen that supported him. After his death in 1456, his older son Ladislaus Hunyadi became the head of the House of Hunyadi, however after murdering the count Ulrich von Cilli, the counselor of the King Ladislaus V of Hungary, he was executed. Then Elizabeth's only son Matthias Corvinus of Hungary was taken to Prague by the young King, who felt for his life before the instability caused after the execution of Ladislaus Hunyadi. Mihály Szilágyi and Elizabeth founded Szilágyi – Hunyadi Liga and became the leaders of this Liga, and after the sudden death of the King Ladislaus (possibly poisoned), she negotiated the release of Matthias, who was soon elected as King of Hungary in 1458.

After this, Elizabeth became the mother of the King, and continued being a great influence in the Kingdom. Matthias had an illegitimate son in 1473, and soon was sent to the properties of his grandmother, who raised him with the best teachers of the Kingdom. The illegitimate John Corvinus never became King of Hungary after the death of Matthias because of the pression of the noblemen and the widow of the monarch, but enjoyed titles and properties, fighting the Turkish armies until the end of his life as his grandfather and father did before. His grandmother Elizabeth lived in Óbuda most of his life, and founded several monasteries and chapels, following her deeply religious beliefs. She died around 1483.

Ancestry

References 

Erzsebet
1410 births
1483 deaths
Hunyadi family
Hungarian nobility
15th-century Hungarian women